The men's pole vault was a track and field athletics event held as part of the Athletics at the 1912 Summer Olympics programme. It was the fifth appearance of the event, which is one of 12 to have been held at every Summer Olympics. The competition was held on Wednesday, July 10, 1912, and on Thursday, July 11, 1912. Twenty-five pole vaulters from eleven nations competed. NOCs could enter up to 12 athletes. It was the second straight Games in which more than 3 medals were awarded in the event. The event was won by Harry Babcock of the United States, the nation's fifth consecutive victory in the event. Fellow Americans Frank Nelson and Marc Wright tied for second and were both awarded silver; normally, this would have constituted a medal sweep. However, bronze medals were awarded to the three men tied for fourth place. This put both Canada and Sweden on the podium for the second consecutive Games and awarded the United States a total of four medals in the 1912 pole vault.

Background

This was the fifth appearance of the event, which is one of 12 athletics events to have been held at every Summer Olympics. The returning vaulters from the 1908 Games were sixth-place finishers Georgios Banikas of Greece and Sam Bellah of the United States. The American team was dominant but there "was no clear American favorite" with many accomplished pole vaulters from the United States. The home team of Sweden was large as well, headlined by Bertil Uggla. Canada's William Halpenny was also a contender, having won the 1908 AAU championship.

Austria, Bohemia, Denmark, Italy, and Russia each made their first appearance in the event. The United States made its fifth appearance, the only nation to have competed at every Olympic men's pole vault to that point.

Competition format

The 1912 tournament introduced a true two-round format, with results cleared between rounds. Vaulters received three attempts at each height.

The qualifying round started with the bar at 3.00 metres, with the height increasing gradually to 3.65 metres. All vaulters clearing 3.65 metres advanced to the final.

The final had the bar initially at 3.40 metres, increasing to 3.50 metres, 3.60 metres, and then by 5 centimetres at a time until a winner was found.

Records

These were the standing world and Olympic records (in metres) prior to the 1912 Summer Olympics.

The Olympic record was equalized or improved 18 times during this competition. Finally Harry Babcock set a new Olympic record with 3.95 metres.

Schedule

Results

Qualifying

Final

Halpenny was forced to retire from the competition after he broke two ribs while clearing 3.80 metres and had to be carried off the field on a stretcher.

References

Sources
 
 

Athletics at the 1912 Summer Olympics
Pole vault at the Olympics